CJ-6 may refer to:

Jeep CJ-6 land transport vehicle
Nanchang CJ-6 aircraft